The British Aircraft Manufacturing Company Limited (formerly the British Klemm Aeroplane Company) was a 1930s British aircraft manufacturer based at London Air Park, Hanworth, Middlesex, England.

History
The German aircraft manufacturer Klemm developed a successful low powered light aeroplane, the Klemm L.25, which first flew in 1927. Several were sold to British owners, where they proved popular, so the British dealer for the L.25, Major E.F Stephen, set up the British Klemm Aeroplane Company at Hanworth, Middlesex to produce a version of the L.25 under licence.

The prototype of the licensed version, known as the B.K. Swallow, first flew in November 1933. The company's first aircraft design was the B.K. Eagle a single-engine cabin monoplane, although similar to the Klemm L.32 was designed by G.H. Handasyde.

The company changed name in 1935 to the British Aircraft Manufacturing Company and new variants of the Swallow and Eagle were designated as the British Aircraft Swallow and Eagle (or B.A Swallow and B.A. Eagle).

The company then followed with a side-by-side two-seat monoplane, the B.A.3 Cupid, but only one was built. The last aircraft produced was the 1936 B.A.IV Double Eagle a six-seat twin-engined high-wing monoplane, only three were built.

On 25 June 1935 the Northern Whig newspaper reported that the British Aircraft Manufacturing Company, Ltd. had acquired the rights from the United Aircraft Corporation of America to manufacture in the United Kingdom the Sikorsky S 42 flying boat. The British Aircraft Manufacturing Company, Ltd. proposed to form a new company to produce the aircraft, this company became the British Marine Aircraft Company which was later reorganised into Folland Aircraft

Aircraft
British Aircraft Swallow
British Aircraft Eagle
British Aircraft Cupid
British Aircraft Double Eagle

Rotorcraft
Cierva C.40

References

Notes

References

Defunct aircraft manufacturers of the United Kingdom
Aircraft industry in London
Vehicle manufacturing companies established in 1933
1933 establishments in England
History of the London Borough of Hounslow
British companies established in 1933